Antonio Šančić and Tristan-Samuel Weissborn were the defending champions but chose not to defend their title.

Alexander Erler and Lucas Miedler won the title after defeating Marco Bortolotti and Sergio Martos Gornés 6–4, 6–2 in the final.

Seeds

Draw

References

External links
 Main draw

Città di Forlì III - Doubles